Ludvig Mathias Lindeman (28 November 1812 – 11 March 1887) was a Norwegian composer and organist. He is most noted for compiling Norwegian folk music in his work Ældre og nyere norske Fjeldmelodier.

Background
Ludvig Mathias Lindeman was born in Trondheim, Sør-Trøndelag, Norway. He was the seventh of ten children born to Ole Andreas Lindeman (1769–1857) and Anna Severine Hickmann (1782–1844). In 1833 he was sent to Oslo to take his final exams and then studied theology at the university. In 1839, Lindeman succeed his elder brother, Jacob Andreas Lindeman (1805–1846), as cantor and organist of the Oslo Cathedral. Lindeman was in the position for 48 years until his death in 1887. Composer Fredrikke Waaler was one of his students.

Career
Lindeman was a contributor to Jørgen Moe's song and folk-ballad collection, Samling af Sange, Folkeviser og Stev i norske Alumuedialekter (1840), putting together the melody supplement to the volume at Bishop Moe's request. The following year, he published his own selection of Norwegian folk melodies, Norske Fjeldmelodier harmonisk bearbeidede for Pianoforte (1841). In 1848, he applied for a university grant to support a trip in the hill country in order to record folk melodies. Later he made two collecting trips, in 1851 and 1864. The first trip was to Telemark, Hardanger, Bergen and Hallingdal and the last to Lillehammer. In all, he collected about 3,000 melodies and lyrics. He published Ældre og nyere norske Fjeldmelodier ("Earlier and more recent Norwegian mountain melodies") in twelve volumes during 1853–1863. This first edition contained 540 melodies, but Lindeman  supplemented the corpus with Halvhundrede norske Fjeldmelodier ("Fifty Norwegian mountain melodies"; 1862).

When in 1871, the major new organ in the Royal Albert Hall in London was inaugurated, Lindeman was invited to perform, along with other noted organists including Anton Bruckner and Camille Saint-Saëns. Lindeman was appointed Knight of the Royal Norwegian Order of St. Olav in 1870. Between 1871 and 1875, he published  Melodier til Landstads Salmebog, containing music for use within the Church of Norway. In 1873, he was invited to write music for the coronation in Trondheim of King Oscar II of Sweden and Queen Sophie. In 1876, he wrote a cantata for the inauguration of Bygdøy chapel. In 1883, together with his son Peter, he started the Organist School in Oslo. The  Conservatory was in operation until 1973, when the Norwegian Academy of Music was established. To honour the memory of the Lindeman family the biggest concert hall at the Academy is named the Lindeman Hall.
Ludvig Mathias Lindeman died in Oslo at 75 years of age. He was buried at Oslo Cathedral. In 1912, a bust of Lindeman  was erected at the church.

Selected works
Norske Fjeldmelodier harmonisk bearbeidede for Pianoforte (1841)
Norske Folkeviser udsatte for 4 Mandsstemmer (1850)
Ældre og nyere norske Fjeldmelodier (1853–1863)
Halvhundrede Norske Fjeldmelodier harmoniserede for Mandsstemmer (1862)
Melodier til Landstads Salmebog (1870)
Norsk Messebog (1870)
Melodier til Landstads Salmebog (1871–1875)
Koralbog, indeholdende de i Landstads Salmebog forekommende Melodier (1878)

References

Other sources
Gaukstad, Øystein L. M. Lindemans komposisjoner (1962)
Gaukstad, Øystein Ludvig Mathias Lindemans samling av norske folkeviser og religiøse folketoner (Novus forlag. Oslo: 1997)

External links

1812 births
1887 deaths
19th-century classical composers
19th-century male musicians
19th-century Norwegian composers
Male classical organists
Musicians from Trondheim
Norwegian classical composers
Norwegian classical organists
Norwegian folk-song collectors
Norwegian male classical composers
Norwegian Romantic composers
Academic staff of the Oslo Conservatory of Music
19th-century organists
19th-century musicologists